Joseph Letseka (born 28 March 1953) is a Lesotho sprinter. He competed in the men's 100 metres at the 1980 Summer Olympics.

References

External links
 

1953 births
Living people
Athletes (track and field) at the 1980 Summer Olympics
Lesotho male sprinters
Olympic athletes of Lesotho
Place of birth missing (living people)